N88 may refer to:
 N88 (Long Island bus)
 Escadrille N.88, a unit of the French Air Force
 , a submarine of the Royal Navy
 Nebraska Highway 88, in the United States
 Volvo N88, a Swedish truck